Moschato is on the Athens Metro Line 1, located in Moschato, southwest Athens, Greece. It is marked at the 3.982 km from the starting point in Piraeus station of Line 1.  The station was opened in 1882 and was renovated in 2003, it features two platforms.

History
In 1869 work commenced on what would be Line 1. Following the acquisition of the railroad by the Bank of Industrial Credit in 1880, development projects were carried out, and this station opened in 1882 when the line was inaugurated. The current form of that station dates back to 2003, with the inauguration on 26 June, as the then ISAP carried out upgrading projects for all line 1 station in view of the Olympic Games of 2004. The station was completely renovated, with new platforms and shelters, creating two additional entrances and new carspark spaces for staff.

Station Layout

Citations

Athens Metro stations
Railway stations opened in 1882
1882 establishments in Greece